Pseudoedophrys is a genus of oriental broad-nosed weevils in the beetle family Curculionidae. There is one described species in Pseudoedophrys, P. hilleri. It originated in Japan, and can now be found in eastern North America.

This species was transferred from Oedophrys into the new genus Pseudoedophrys in 2006.

References

External links

 

Weevils